The 1919 Notre Dame Fighting Irish football team was an American football team that represented the University of Notre Dame as an independent during the 1919 college football season. The team compiled a perfect 9–0 record and outscored opponents by a total of 229 to 47. 

Knute Rockne was in his second year as the team's head coach. Gus Dorais was the assistant coach.

There was no contemporaneous system in 1919 for determining a national champion. However, Notre Dame was retroactively named as the co-national champion for 1919 by the National Championship Foundation and Parke H. Davis. Other selectors chose Harvard, Illinois, and/or Texas A&M as the 1919 national champion or co-champion. 

Five persons affiliated with the 1919 Notre Dame team were inducted into the College Football Hall of Fame: coach Rockne (inducted 1951); end George Gipp (inducted 1951); assistant coach Dorais (inducted 1954); end Eddie Anderson (inducted 1971); and guard Hunk Anderson (inducted 1974). In addition, tackle George Trafton was inducted in 1964 into the Pro Football Hall of Fame. Quarterback Leonard Bahan was the team captain. Other notable players from the 1919 Notre Dame team included Bernard Kirk, Cy DeGree, and John Mohardt.

The team played its home games at Cartier Field in Notre Dame, Indiana.

Schedule

References

Notre Dame
Notre Dame Fighting Irish football seasons
College football national champions
College football undefeated seasons
Notre Dame Fighting Irish football